Assassination Vacation is a 2005 book by Sarah Vowell,  in which she travels around the United States researching the assassinations of U.S. Presidents Abraham Lincoln, James A. Garfield and William McKinley.  While most of the book is devoted to facts about the assassinated presidents and the men who would murder them, Vowell intersperses anecdotes of her self-proclaimed "pilgrimage" of presidential assassinations, including a production of the 1990 musical Assassins.

Audiobook

An abridged audiobook was released by Simon & Schuster on March 29, 2005.  It contained a large cast of readers, and original music was composed by Michael Giacchino. In order of appearance, the cast was:

Conan O'Brien as Robert Todd Lincoln 
Eric Bogosian as John Wilkes Booth
Stephen King as Abraham Lincoln
Dave Eggers as Mike Ryan
Catherine Keener as Gretchen Worden
Jon Stewart as James A. Garfield
Tony Kushner as John Humphrey Noyes
Brad Bird as Charles Guiteau and Emma Goldman
Daniel Handler as William McKinley
Greg Giraldo as Theodore Roosevelt
David Rakoff as Leon Czolgosz

See also
 Assassination of Abraham Lincoln
 Assassination of James A. Garfield
 Assassination of William McKinley

References

External links
Book discussion on Assassination Vacation, C-SPAN, April 27, 2005

2005 non-fiction books
2005 audio plays
Books by Sarah Vowell
Works about assassinations in the United States
Books about Abraham Lincoln
Books about William McKinley
Books about Theodore Roosevelt
Books about James A. Garfield
Assassination of James A. Garfield
Assassination of William McKinley
Assassination of Abraham Lincoln
Cultural depictions of Abraham Lincoln
Cultural depictions of James A. Garfield
Cultural depictions of William McKinley
Cultural depictions of John Wilkes Booth
Cultural depictions of Theodore Roosevelt